Reina Mercedes, was an  of the Spanish Navy.

During the Spanish–American War, Reina Mercedes was captured by the United States and later salvaged and commissioned into the U.S. Navy. For information about her characteristics and operational history in U.S. Navy service, see .

Technical characteristics
Reina Mercedes was built by the naval shipyard at Cartagena and launched on 9 September 1887. She had two funnels. Her main armament was built by Hontoria and sponson-mounted. Her five torpedo tubes all were fixed; two were forward, one was on each beam, and one was aft. Although unprotected and therefore lacking armor, she had 12 watertight compartments built in a French-style cellular system to help her resist flooding. She was designed for colonial service, with high speed and moderate armament, but in practice chronic machinery problems made her a relatively slow steamer.

Operational history

Reina Mercedes spent her early years in Spanish waters as part of the Spanish Navy's Instructional Squadron. In 1893 she was transferred to the Caribbean, where she became flagship of Spanish naval forces operating in Cuban waters.

When the Spanish–American War broke out in April 1898, Reina Mercedes was in the harbor at Santiago de Cuba, on Cuba's southeastern coast, awaiting repair, with seven of her ten boilers out of commission. Little of military significance happened at Santiago de Cuba until Vice Admiral Pascual Cervera y Topete's squadron arrived there from Spain on 19 May 1898 to reinforce Spanish forces in the Caribbean. U.S. Navy forces hunting Cervera found his squadron there on the evening of 27 May 1898, and a 37-day blockade of the harbor ensued.

During the blockade, Reina Mercedes traded blows with the American blockaders. On 3 June 1898, the U.S. Navy attempted to trap the Spanish ships in the harbor by sinking the collier  in the entrance channel. Spanish shore batteries disabled Merrimac, and she drifted up the channel toward the anchored Spanish warships; Reina Mercedes, the armored cruiser , and the destroyer  opened fire on Merrimac as well, and the collier soon sank in a position which did not block the channel. Reina Mercedes took aboard as prisoners of war the eight Americans who had been aboard Merrimac.

On 6 June 1898, the blockading U.S. warships bombarded the harbor, hitting Reina Mercedes 35 times, starting two fires aboard her, and killing her second-in-command, Commander Emilio Acosta y Eyermann, the first Spanish naval officer to die in the war.

By the beginning of July 1898, U.S. Army forces advancing overland seemed to be on the verge of capturing Santiago de Cuba, prompting Cervera to order his squadron to attempt an escape by running the blockade. Reina Mercedes could not follow because of her boiler problems. It was decided that most of her guns would be placed ashore to aid in the defense of Santiago de Cuba and that she would be sunk in the entrance channel to prevent her capture and to improve the harbor's defenses by preventing American ships from entering it.

On 3 July 1898, Cervera's squadron attempted its escape, and was completely destroyed in the Battle of Santiago de Cuba. At about 2000 hours on 4 July 1898, Reina Mercedes, by now without most of her guns, slipped her moorings and proceeded into the channel. Just before midnight, the battleship  spotted her and, together with the battleship  opened fire. Although Reina Mercedes took many hits, her scuttling crew stayed on course, dropped anchor, and detonated their scuttling charges, but Reina Mercedes drifted to the eastern edge of the channel before sinking, going down in a location that failed to block the channel.

Between 2 January 1899 and 1 March 1899, the U.S. Navy raised her and later put her into service as the disarmed receiving ship .

See also

Notes

References

 Cevera y Topete, Pascual, Ed. Office of Naval Intelligence War Notes No. VII: Information From Abroad: The Spanish–American War: A Collection of Documents Relative to the Squadron Operations in the West Indies, Translated From the Spanish. Washington, D.C.: Government Printing Office, 1899.
 Chesneau, Roger, and Eugene M. Kolesnik, Eds. Conway's All the World's Fighting Ships 1860–1905. New York, New York: Mayflower Books Inc., 1979. .
 Nofi, Albert A. The Spanish–American War, 1898. Conshohocken, Pennsylvania: Combined Books, Inc., 1996. .

External links

 The Spanish–American War Centennial Website: Reina Mercedes
 Department of the Navy: Naval Historical Center: Online Library of Selected Images: Spanish Navy Ships: Reina Mercedes (Cruiser, 1887–1898)

Alfonso XII-class cruisers
Ships built in Cartagena, Spain
1887 ships
Spanish–American War cruisers of Spain
Maritime incidents in 1898
Scuttled vessels
Captured ships
Shipwrecks in the Caribbean Sea
Shipwrecks of the Spanish–American War